Ring Ring is a 2019 American action thriller film directed by Adam Marino and starring Malcolm Goodwin, Kirby Bliss Blanton, Tommy Kijas and Lou Ferrigno.

Cast
Kirby Bliss Blanton as Amber
Lou Ferrigno as Mr. Daniels
Malcolm Goodwin as Will
Tommy Kijas as Jacob
Josh Zuckerman as Jason
Alex Shaffer as Damien

Release
The film was released on July 19, 2019.

Reception
Bradley Gibson of Film Threat rated the film a 7 out of 10.

Frank Scheck of The Hollywood Reporter gave the film a positive review and wrote, "But despite its very brief running time, the movie feels plodding, never quite managing to land either the intended dark humor or scares to which it aspires."

References

External links
 
 

2010s English-language films